Most of the 25 million followers of Sikhism, the world's fifth-largest religion, live in the northern Indian state of Punjab, the only Sikh-majority administrative division on Earth, but Sikh communities exist on every inhabited continent. Sizeable Sikh populations in countries across the world exist in India (20,833,116), Canada (771,790), England (520,092), the United States (~472,498), and Australia (210,397), while countries with the largest proportions of Sikhs include Canada (2.12%), India (1.72%), Cyprus (1.1%) and England (0.92%), New Zealand (0.87%), and Australia (0.83%).

Administrative divisions with significant proportions of Sikhs include Punjab, India (Sikhs account for 58 percent of the population), Chandigarh, India (13.1 percent), British Columbia, Canada (5.9 percent), Haryana, India (4.9 percent), Delhi, India (3.4 percent), West Midlands, England (2.9 percent), Manitoba, Canada (2.7 percent), Alberta, Canada (2.5 percent), Uttarakhand, India (2.3 percent), and Ontario, Canada (2.1 percent). Meanwhile, cities outside India with the largest Sikh populations are Brampton, Ontario, Canada (163,260), Surrey, British Columbia, Canada (154,415), and London, England (144,543).

Countries 
The figures on the table below are either based on each of the country's respective censuses or are calculated by specific organizations. Some of these figures are rounded off. In case of conflicting estimates, both the lowest and highest estimates are included.

Largest proportions 
  2.12%
  1.72%
  1.1%
 0.88%
  0.88%
  0.83%
  0.66%
  0.60%
  0.57%
  0.44%

Largest populations 
  23,623,837
  771,790
 524,000
  ~500,000 
  210,397
   150,000
   120,000
  52,000
  50,000
  40,908
   40,000
  35,540
  26,000
  15,000
  15,000
  15,000
  13,280
  12,000
  10,000
  10,000

Subnational divisions

Historical Demographics 
The Afghan Sikh population declined from between 200,000 and 500,000 (1.8% to 4.6% of the Afghan population) in the 1970s to 45 in 2022 following decades of conflict.

See also
 Sikh diaspora
 Punjabis

General:
 List of religious populations

Notes

References

 
Sikh enclaves